Allan Banegas (born 4 October 1993) is a Honduran footballer. He represented Honduras in the football competition at the 2016 Summer Olympics., and plays as midfielder for C.D. Olimpia since January 2021.

Honours and awards

Club
C.D. Marathón
Liga Profesional de Honduras: 2017–18 C
Honduran Cup: 2017
Honduran Supercup: 2019

References

Honduran footballers
1993 births
Living people
C.D. Marathón players
Footballers at the 2016 Summer Olympics
Olympic footballers of Honduras
People from Colón Department (Honduras)
Association football midfielders
C.D. Olimpia players